Queensland Police  is responsible for providing policing services to Queensland, Australia and crime statistics for the state are provided on their website.

Brisbane

Brisbane, the state capital of Queensland.

Crime statistics
There are a number of areas throughout the Brisbane Metro Area which have shown escalating criminal activity and gang activity over the past decade. Some of these areas included areas neighboring the Brisbane city limits such as the Gold Coast and Surfers Paradise.

The suburbs of Augustine Heights, Bellbird Park, Camira, Carole Park, Gailes, Goodna and Springfield in Ipswich recorded the highest number of break-ins in 2012.

Although Underwood and surrounds has been identified as the state’s home break-in hot spot.

In August 2013, the Queensland Police Service launched an online crime map to provide crime data to the public.

Number of total offenses in Queensland since 2012:

2012: 437,863

2013: 435,599

2014: 440,986

2015: 460,113

2016: 503,278

2017: 493,230

2018: 516,899

2019: 543,605

2020: 501,093

2021: 505,177

2022: 559,877

2023: 99,385 (March 14)

Public transport

Trains and Railway Stations 
Some railway stations have issues with youth gangs and individuals harassing passengers and police officers.

Other stations with just between four and six assaults in the same period were South Brisbane, Cannon Hill, Beenleigh, Central, Strathpine and Caboolture. Burpengary, Bald Hills and Indooroopilly train stations were the only on the Citytrain network to have a grievous assault - defined as potentially causing permanent injury or disability.
Queensland Police Operations Support Command said in 2008 that the network is safe and that the rate of crime is not worse than that in the community in general, explaining that the perception it was higher was due to the close confines of being in a passenger train.  The network operator, Queensland Rail, implemented various security initiatives over more than a decade that includes closed-circuit television at stations and within trains, and patrols over the network and on-board services by Revenue Protection Officers, uniformed and plain-clothed police officers of the network's own squad, and security guards, to deter crime and assist with identifying offenders.

Busses 
Attacks against bus drivers are uncommon but not unheard of in Brisbane. In late 2019, TransLink, the city's bus network operator, launched a bus driver safety campaign in partnership with the Queensland Government. The campaign, See It From Their Side, funds a number of public awareness campaigns (television, radio, and print), the installation of physical safety measures, additional Senior Network Officers (transport fare and safety enforcement officers), and further policy development.

Youth gangs
Youth gangs have played a large part in the amount of crime occurring within various problem areas of Brisbane. Such violence prompted the Queensland Commissioner to reactivate a Youth Gang Task-force in 2008.

Other crime

In October 2021, a wanted man tried to enter Queensland from New South Wales in a suitcase in that back of a truck. He was a drug smuggler and was not meant to leave his house. He was probably trying to leave the country. Police check vehicles because of the COVID-19 and they were surprised when there was a knock on the wall.

References

External links
Queensland Police

 
Crime in Brisbane